The Brave Adventures of a Little Shoemaker  is a 2013 film directed by Silvije Petranović. It is based on the book The Brave Adventures of Lapitch by Ivana Brlić-Mažuranić. In just 18 days after the opening, it became the most-watched Croatian children's fiction film.

Cast
 Mile Biljanović - Lapitch
 Ena Lulić - Gita
 Goran Navojec - Master
 Hristina Popović - Mistress
 Milan Pleština - Black man
 Livio Badurina - Circus master
 Mustafa Nadarević - Good basketman
 Nikola Kojo - Rich basketman
 Špiro Guberina - Old milkman

Original music score
The original motion picture soundtrack, The Brave Adventures of a Little Shoemaker, was composed by Croatian composer Anita Andreis and released on 31 December 2015.

Nominations and awards
 Lucas - International Festival of Films for Children and Young People 2014  Nominated  Lucas Best Film Silvije Petranovic
 Pula Film Festival 2015  Won Audience Award "Golden Gate Pula" Silvije Petranovic

References

External links
 Official website of producer
 

2013 films
2013 action films
Films based on Croatian novels
Croatian children's films